Novoakkulayevo (Yañı Aqqolay) is a rural locality (a selo) in Kurmankeyevsky Selsoviet, Davlekanovsky District, Bashkortostan, Russia. The population was 195 as of 2010. There are 2 streets.

Geography 
Novoakkulayevo is located 12 km south of Davlekanovo (the district's administrative centre) by road. Staroakkulayevo is the nearest rural locality.

References 

Rural localities in Davlekanovsky District